The 1974 Midlands International, also known as the Omaha International, was a men's tennis tournament played on indoor carpet courts at the City Auditorium in Omaha, Nebraska in the United States that was part of the 1974 USLTA Indoor Circuit. It was the fifth and last edition of the event and was held from January 22 through January 27, 1974. Third-seeded Karl Meiler won the singles title and earned $4,000 first-prize money.

Finals

Singles
 Karl Meiler defeated  Jimmy Connors 6–3, 1–6, 6–1
 It was Meiler's 1st singles title of the year and 2nd of his career.

Doubles
 Jürgen Fassbender /  Karl Meiler defeated  Ian Fletcher /  Kim Warwick 6–2, 6–4

References

External links
 ITF tournament edition details

Midlands International
Midlands International
Midlands International